is a 1978 Japanese historical martial arts period film directed by Kinji Fukasaku. It depicts the story of the forty-seven Ronin (Chūshingura). The film is one of a series of period films by Fukasaku starring Yorozuya Kinnosuke, including Shogun's Samurai.
The film received one nomination for the Award of the Japanese Academy for best cinematography.

Plot
Lord Tsunayoshi of the Tokugawa shogunate strips 48 samurai of their assets, but they are afraid to resist and nevertheless attend a ceremony where he is presented with the Imperial Sword. Enraged by insults from the court official Kira, Asano draws his sword but is prevented from killing him. Asano is sentenced to seppuku, his land and property are seized by the shogunate, and the Asano name is abolished. Several disciples of Asano, upset about the one-sided verdict, vow to return to Edo to take vengeance on Kira. They wait a year for an opportune time to make their move.

Kira retires and Tsunayoshi's follower Lord Yanagisawa sends Kira to Yonezawa. Hashimoto and Horibe of the Asano clan hastily choose to ambush him en route against orders but are stopped by spies and other members of their clan and Hashimoto is injured. Yanagisawa dispatches three criminals to kill Oishi, the only perceived threat. Oishi divorces his wife and sends her and their younger children to her father's home but keeps his eldest son and heir Chikara with him. The three attackers enter Oishi's house and attack but the ronin Fuwa, who is living in the woods near his former master Oishi's home, intervenes and kills them, saving Oishi and Chikara.

Lord Kira's attendant Kobayashi Heihachiro attempts to slay Oishi but kills a different man who happens to be sleeping in his room. Kobayashi visits Hashimoto, who is unable to work due to his leg injury, forcing his wife into prostitution. Kobayashi offers him 50 ryo to reveal the location of Oishi. Hashimoto refuses and attacks with his sword but is overpowered. Kobayashi leaves the money and says that he already knows that Oishi is in Edo.

When Kira goes to Uesugi mansion in Sakurada, Oishi tells the clan that the raid will take place the following night. Jujiro delivers the message to Hashimoto, who is now unable to fight and angrily draws his sword on his fellow clan member delivering the message. His wife stabs him in an attempt to stop him and he kills her as well, proclaiming that it is Oishi's fault for waiting too long, then he kills himself. Jujiro brings their infant daughter to Oishi.

The Ako warriors descend on an inn where Kira is sleeping following a tea ceremony. Fuwa defeats Kobayashi after a long battle, then they search the house for those who are hiding. Kira is found and they blow a whistle to summon Oishi, who kills him. Asano's wife is told of their success and she is overcome with regret that 47 ronin have now sacrificed themselves for one man. Yanagisawa views their act as an attack on the infallibility of the shogunate and sentences them all to seppuku but the shogunate also abolishes the name Kira.

Cast

Yorozuya Kinnosuke as Ōishi Kuranosuke
Sonny Chiba as Fuwa Kazuemon
Tsunehiko Watase as Kobayashi Heihachiro
Masaomi Kondo as Hashimoto Heizaemon
Toshiro Mifune as Tsuchiya Michinao
Kyōko Enami as Ukibashi
Mitsuteru Nakamura as Date Muratoyo
Shinsuke Mikimoto as Tsuchiya Masanao
Teruhiko Saigō as Asano Takumi no Kami
Nobuo Kaneko as Kira Kōzukenosuke
Hiroki Matsukata as Denhachiro Tamon
Yoshiko Mita as Yozeiin
Mariko Okada as Ōishi Riku
Sanae Nakahara as Todano Tsubone
Ken Nishida as Asano Daigaku
Junkichi Orimoto as Izeki Tokubei
Kyoko Enami as Ukihashi
Jun Fujimaki as Okajima
Runtarō Mine as Hayami Toemon
Toru Minegishi as Horibe Yasubei
Minori Terada as Otaka Gengo
 Ryosuke Kagawa as Uchikawa Magozaemon
Naruse Masashi as Okano Kingoemon
Yoshirō Aoki as Ueda Mondo
Tatsuo Endō as Yoshida Chuzaemon
Mieko Harada as Hatsune Hatsu
Kensaku Morita as Hazama Jujirō
Ryo Tamura as Uesugi Noritsuna
Hiroshi Miyauchi as Kayano Sanppie
Seizo Fukumoto as Spy
Takuya Fujioka as Ōno Kurobei
Go Wakabayashi as Araki
Hideji Otaki
Mikio Narita as Katō Etchu
Tetsurō Tamba as Yanagisawa

References

External links

1978 films
1978 martial arts films
1970s Japanese-language films
Films about the Forty-seven Ronin
Films directed by Kinji Fukasaku
Films set in castles
Films set in the 1700s
Films set in Edo
Films set in Hyōgo Prefecture
Films set in Kyoto
Films set in the Edo period
Jidaigeki films
Samurai films
Toei Company films
1970s Japanese films